The 1900 United States presidential election in Vermont took place on November 6, 1900 as part of the 1900 United States presidential election. Voters chose four representatives, or electors to the Electoral College, who voted for president and vice president.

Vermont overwhelmingly voted for the Republican nominee, President William McKinley, over the Democratic nominee, former U.S. Representative and 1896 Democratic presidential nominee William Jennings Bryan. McKinley won Vermont by a landslide margin of 52.87% in this rematch of the 1896 presidential election. The return of economic prosperity and recent victory in the Spanish–American War helped McKinley to score a decisive victory.

Four years earlier, McKinley had won Vermont with 80.08% of the popular vote, making it his strongest victory in the 1896 presidential election in terms of percentage in the popular vote as well as the best performance of any presidential candidate in the Green Mountain State to date. The Green Mountain State would once again be McKinley's strongest state in popular vote percentage, though with a slightly reduced margin of 75.73%.

Results

Results by county

See also
 United States presidential elections in Vermont

References

Vermont
1900
1900 Vermont elections